These are the official results of the Men's 20 km Walk event at the 1987 World Championships in Rome, Italy. The race was held on Sunday, August 30, 1987.

Medalists

Abbreviations
All times shown are in hours:minutes:seconds

Records

Final

See also
 1978 Men's European Championships 20km Walk (Prague)
 1980 Men's Olympic 20km Walk (Moscow)
 1982 Men's European Championships 20km Walk (Athens)
 1984 Men's Olympic 20km Walk (Los Angeles)
 1986 Men's European Championships 20km Walk (Stuttgart)
 1987 Race Walking Year Ranking
 1988 Men's Olympic 20km Walk (Seoul)

References
 Results
 Die Leichtathletik-Statistik-Seite

W
Racewalking at the World Athletics Championships